João Ferreira, usually known as Bigode ("moustache" in Portuguese) (4 April 1922 – 31 July 2003), was a Brazilian footballer who played left back and also played in the 1950 FIFA World Cup.

Club career
Bigode started his career playing for Atlético Mineiro, of his home city Belo Horizonte, Minas Gerais state. He won the Campeonato Mineiro twice, in 1941 and in 1942. He then moved to Fluminense of Rio de Janeiro in 1943, where he won the Campeonato Carioca in 1946.  After leaving Fluminense in 1949, Bigode joined his former club's rivals Flamengo in 1950, where he stayed until 1952, when he returned to Fluminense, and retired in 1956.

International career
Bigode played eleven matches for the Brazil national team between 1949 and 1953. In 1949, he won the South American Championship. He was also part of the Brazilian team that finished as the 1950 FIFA World Cup's runners-up, after being defeated 2–1 by Uruguay at Estádio do Maracanã, in what is known as the Maracanazo. In this game Bigode was in poor form, as Alcides Ghiggia dribbled him in both Uruguayan goals. However, it was goalkeeper Moacyr Barbosa who was blamed for the defeat.

Death
Bigode died in Belo Horizonte on 31 July 2003 after suffering from respiratory problems.

Honours
Bigode won the following honors during his playing career:

Club
Atlético Mineiro
Campeonato Mineiro: 1941, 1942

Fluminense
Campeonato Carioca: 1946

International
Brazil
South American Championship: 1949

References

External links

1922 births
2003 deaths
Footballers from Belo Horizonte
Brazilian footballers
Brazil international footballers
1950 FIFA World Cup players
Clube Atlético Mineiro players
Fluminense FC players
CR Flamengo footballers
Association football defenders